Andrea Carlson is a Canadian chef and restaurateur whose restaurant, Burdock & Co., was awarded a Michelin Star in October 2022. It is the first restaurant owned and operated by a female chef to receive a Michelin Star in Canada. Based in Vancouver, British Columbia, she is known for her practice of a 100 mile diet and incorporation of local, organic ingredients.  Born in Toronto, Ontario, Carlson grew up in a household with two working parents. As a result, she was often left to fend for herself to create meals. Carlson purchased a New York Times cookbook at the age of 13, and was immediately interested in pursuing a career in the culinary arts. She attended the Dubrulle Culinary Arts School (now the Art Institute of Vancouver).

Career 
Carlson started her cooking career at Star Anise restaurant (now closed), as a garde manger. She followed her time at Star Anise working at other Vancouver area restaurants that included Raincity Grill, C Restaurant, and, on Vancouver Island, Sooke Harbour House. From 2007 to 2012, Carlson worked at Vancouver's Bishop's Restaurant, where she served as Executive Chef.

Burdock & Co. / Harvest Community Foods / Bar Gobo 
In 2012, Carlson opened Harvest Community Foods - a local foods grocer and ramen bar that focuses on transparency and sustainability. 

In April 2013, Andrea opened Burdock & Co. - a restaurant that continues Chef Andrea's theme of using fresh, local, organic ingredients to create polished, original dishes available at a medium price point.

In August 2020, Carlson opened her third venture, Bar Gobo, a wine bar, in the Chinatown neighbourhood of Vancouver.

T.V. appearances 
 http://globalnews.ca/news/2325455/recipe-harvest-squash-ramen/
 http://www.btvancouver.ca/videos/4630067757001/
 http://globalnews.ca/video/2262148/burdock-and-co-chickpea-chanterelle-and-falafel-salad 
 http://www.btvancouver.ca/videos/4447216932001/

References 
 http://www.ravenoustraveler.com/2015/08/interview-with-andrea-carlson-executive.html
 http://www.burdockandco.com/#about
 http://foodtalks.ca/
 http://harvestunion.ca/#team 
 https://web.archive.org/web/20151210224141/http://blogs.vancouversun.com/2013/04/17/i-review-harvest-community-foods/
 https://thetyee.ca/Life/2006/11/30/100MileChef/
 http://vancouverisawesome.com/2015/12/09/8-vancouver-chefs-you-should-know-about/

Living people
Businesspeople from Toronto
Canadian women chefs
Canadian restaurateurs
Women restaurateurs
Year of birth missing (living people)
Chefs from Toronto
Chefs from Vancouver